ClearScore is a British financial technology business founded in July 2015, by Justin Basini (b. June 1974), Nigel Morris and Dan Cobley (b. June 1967).  It was the first company in the United Kingdom to provide free credit scores and reports, along with advice to help consumers make better financial decisions. ClearScore has since expanded to include increased visibility of affordability, using current account spending patterns via Open Banking. The company has over 17m users and operates in the United Kingdom, Australia, South Africa and Canada.

In March 2018, Experian announced plans to acquire ClearScore for £275 million ($366 million). The acquisition was abandoned in February 2019 after the UK's Competition and Markets Authority (CMA) indicated that they considered that the acquisition would reduce competition in the UK market.

ClearScore is supported by investment from QED Investors, Blenheim Chalcot and Lead Edge Capital.

ClearScore has won a number of industry awards, including The Queens Award for Innovation, Deloitte Fast 50, Sunday Times Tech Track 100, and was listed on the Sunday Times Best Places To Work in 2020.

ClearScore earns revenue from financial institutions, who pay ClearScore when acquiring new customers through the service. The Group partners with over 150 financial institutions around the world.

History 
ClearScore launched on 15 July 2015. It was the UK's first service giving consumers access to their credit score and report. Its initial offering provided credit scores and reports, and in July 2015 the company added credit card offers to its site, and in September 2015 it added personal loan offers. In December 2015 it launched the UK’s first credit checking app.

In July 2016 the company added a credit history feature called Timeline to its site. In November 2016 it added car finance offers, and in February 2017 launched a chatbot to help users improve their credit. In April 2020, the firm launched the dark web monitoring service ClearScore Protect.

The company launched in South Africa in June 2017, India in August 2018, Australia in February 2020 and Canada in September 2022. ClearScore India closed in 2020 as a result of the coronavirus pandemic.

In September 2018, the Advertising Standards Authority received 35 complaints that a ClearScore TV advert aired in June "trivialised" domestic violence. The ad was cleared by the ASA.

In 2020 it launched a Dark Web Monitoring service called ClearScore Protect.

In 2021 the ClearScore Group launched a second app, called DriveScore, using cutting edge telematics technology to give drivers data on their driving performance so that they can save money on car insurance if they choose to share the data.

In 2022, the ClearScore Group acquired Money Dashboard, a leading provider of open banking technology and opened a secondary UK technology and data science hub in Edinburgh.

Products and Services
Most of ClearScore’s services are free to consumers.  This includes credit scores and credit reports from credit bureaus Equifax (in the UK) and Experian (in South Africa and Australia).

ClearScore offers personalised insights about credit scores and tips on how to improve them.

ClearScore also presents tailored financial offers based on users’ individual credit ratings. The higher a user's credit score, the more likely they are to see credit card and loan offers. ClearScore brings exclusive offers that cannot be found elsewhere and users can often be pre-approved, helping improve certainty.

ClearScore Protect provides dark web monitoring for users.

ClearScore offers an ‘Affordability Score’, which uses Open Banking technology to help users understand what borrowing they can afford and 'Triple Lock’ giving users enhanced confidence when applying for credit.

New features have continued to be added to the ClearScore product, including ‘ClearSaver’, a new initiative to give users who connect their bank accounts via Open Banking, access to better rates on credit cards, loans and car finance.

References

Credit scoring